Anni-Frid Lyngstad is the eponymous compilation album by Anni-Frid Lyngstad, released by Emidisc in 1971, after Lyngstad ended her 5-year contract with EMI's Swedish division. All songs on this album are included in the EMI compilation album Frida 1967-1972.

Background

Overview
The same year in 1971 that Lyngstad had had her first Svensktoppen number one, "Min Egen Stad", a Swedish language version of the Hep Stars track "It's Nice To Be Back Again", she did not renew her contract with EMI, and was signed to Polar Music to record her first single with the latter independent label. The expiration allowed EMI to release the compilation album, Anni-Frid Lyngstad, under EMI's budget label, Emidisc.

Content
The album opens with "Min Egen Stad" and "En Gång Är Ingen Gång", the B and A-side of Lyngstad's penultimate single, respectively, whereas the ultimate single she recorded was, 'Vi är alla bara barn i början', which was not included on this compilation album, for the EMI label before signing with Polar Music, both produced by Benny Andersson and with backing vocals by all four future ABBA members.

Track listing

Side 1
"Min Egen Stad" (Benny Andersson, Peter Himmelstrand) - 3:00
"En Gång Är Ingen Gång" ("There Goes My Everything") (Dallas Frazier, Stikkan Anderson) - 2:46
"Försök Och Sov På Saken" ("Surround Yourself with Sorrow") (Bill Martin, Phil Coulter, Bo-Göran Edling) - 2:40
"Peter Pan" (Benny Andersson, Björn Ulvaeus) - 2:09
"Räkna De Lyckliga Stunderna Blott" (Jules Sylvain, Karl-Ewert) - 2:38
"Där Du Går Lämnar Kärleken Spår" ("Love Grows (Where My Rosemary Goes)") (Barry Mason, Tony Macaulay, Olle Bergman) - 2:43

Side 2
"Härlig Är Vår Jord" (Ivan Renliden) - 2:42
"Peter Kom Tillbaka" ("Junge, Komm Bald Wieder") (Lotar Olias, Olle Bergman) - 3:07
"Simsalabim" (Gunnar Sandevärn) - 2:30
"En Ledig Dag" ("Weekend in Portofino") (Matteo Chiosso, Bruno Defilippi, Bengt Sten) - 2:55
"Du Är Så Underbart Rar" ("Can't Take My Eyes Off You") (Bob Crewe, Bob Gaudio, B.S. Bimen) - 3:17
"Så Synd Du Måste Gå" ("Comment te dire adieu?"|"It Hurts To Say Goodbye") (Jack Gold, Arnold Golan, Stikkan Anderson) - 2:24

References

Sources
 Carl Magnus Palm: ABBA - The Complete Recording Sessions, Century 22 Limited UK, 1994. 
 Liner notes CD compilation Frida 1967-1972, EMI Music Sweden 1997.

Anni-Frid Lyngstad albums
1971 compilation albums
EMI Records compilation albums